Nyctimystes eucavatus  is a species of tree frog in the family Hylidae.  It is endemic to eastern Papua New Guinea.  Scientists have observed it between 800 and 1200 meters above sea level in the eastern mountains.

This frog's eggs are about 2.2 mm in diameter.

References

Frogs of Asia
eucavatus